Workspace is a term used in various branches of engineering and economic development.

Workspace may also refer to:
 Workspace (GUI), the grouping of windows in some window managers
 Google Workspace, a collection of cloud computing, productivity and collaboration tools, software and products
 Workspace Group, a real estate investment trust
 Workspace.com, a provider of an online collaborative workspace for information technology teams